Lee Seung-ah (born Lee Mi-joo on September 23, 1994), known as Lee Mi-joo, is a South Korean singer, dancer and entertainer. She debuted as a member of South Korean girl group Lovelyz under Woollim Entertainment in November 2014. Apart from her group's activities, Lee has starred in various Korean variety shows such as, Hit The Stage (2016), Dunia: Into a New World (2018), My Mad Beauty (2018–2019), Shopping Cart Savior (2019), Sixth Sense (2020–2022), Hangout with Yoo (2021) and season 2 of Learn Way (2021–2022). Lee made her acting debut with I'm a Job Seeker (2016).

On November 16, 2021, she left Woollim Entertainment after deciding not to renew her contract, and later joined Antenna for her future solo activities.

Early life
Mijoo was born on September 23, 1994, in Okcheon County, North Chungcheong Province, South Korea.

Career

2014–2017: Debut with Lovelyz and career beginnings

Mijoo debuted with Lovelyz, which was first announced on November 5, 2014, by Woollim Entertainment. Lovelyz released a pre-release digital single, "Good Night Like Yesterday", on November 5, 2014. Their debut showcase was held on November 12 at the K-ART Hall in Olympic Park, and their debut stage was on the next day on Mnet M Countdown. The group's debut studio album Girls' Invasion was officially released on November 17, along with its lead single titled "Candy Jelly Love".

Mijoo made a cameo in The Gentlemen of Wolgyesu Tailor Shop in 2016. She participated in the dance survival show Hit the Stage. She placed 6th by the end of episode 8 and was eventually eliminated. She was also a host in Inkigayo alongside bandmate Kei and BTS members Jin and RM. Mijoo was cast in the television series I'm a Job Seeker, playing the role as Na Young-hee.

2018–present: Solo activities
Mijoo was part of the cast of Dunia: Into a New World alongside Yunho, DinDin, Sam Okyere, Kwon Hyun-bin and many more. She was also part of My Mad Beauty 2 with Lee Jin-yi, Hyoyeon and Park Na-rae. She is part of the third season of the series alongside Park Na-rae, Choi Yoo-jung and Han Hye-jin. She is also cast in the television show In-laws In Practice (2018), paired with Kwon Hyuk-soo and Shopping Cart Saviour (2019) together with Haha and more. In 2020, Mijoo also joined a variety show in TVN called Sixth Sense with Yoo Jae-seok, Jeon So-min, Oh Na-ra and Jessi. Season 2 aired on Fridays at 20:40 (KST) beginning June 25, 2021, and consists of 14 episodes, with additional cast member Lee Sang-yeob. Her stint in Sixth Sense 2 garnered Mijoo increased popularity, and she was nicknamed the "Entertainment Trend" following guest appearances in various major entertainment programs, such as Running Man, Knowing Bros, and 2 Days & 1 Night. She also appears on the MBC reality-variety show Hangout with Yoo beginning in August 2021. In Episode 124, it was confirmed that Lee Mijoo, Haha, Shin Bong-sun, and Jeong Jun-ha would be officially joining Yoo Jae-seok as fixed cast members of Hangout With Yoo. In February 2022, Mijoo took on her first main MC role along broadcaster Boom for Mnet's TMI Show. The program was later renamed to TMI News Show. In April 2022, Mijoo was announced as one of the cast members of JTBC's new music variety show New Festa along with You Hee-yeol, Yoon Jong-shin, Lee Sang Soon, Gummy, and Kyu-hyun. In July 2022, Mijoo teamed up with Boom once again to be the MC of JTBC's short-form video challenge program, I Want to Be A Celebrity, along with cast members Shortbox, Aiki, Winner's Lee Seung-hoon, Kim Gye-ran, Pony, and Shin Ji-yeon. Mijoo joined wavve dating program Some-ping as an MC along with Jo Se-ho, Uhm Ji-yoon, and Winner's Kang Seung-yoon and Kim Jin-woo which premiered in August 2022. In October 2022, Mijoo was announced as a host of the second season of KBS2 program Battle Trip. In November 2022, Mijoo was an MC of Coupang Play dating show Office Romance. 

On March 9, 2021, Mijoo revealed on Cultwo Show that she had changed her legal name to Lee Seung-ah.

On November 1, 2021, Woollim Entertainment announced Mijoo would not renew her contract and left the company on November 16, 2021, following Lovelyz's disbandment.  On November 17, it was announced that Mijoo signed with Antenna.

On December 29, 2021, Mijoo received the Female Rookie of the Year Award at the MBC Entertainment Awards for her work in Hangout with Yoo.

Mijoo was described as an "advertising blue chip" because of her success as a model for brands in various industries. In January 2022, Mijoo became the muse of Oryany, a South Korean global fashion brand for the 2022 SS season. She was chosen because "[they] expect a synergy with Lee Mi-joo, who has a casual yet sensitive fashion sense, and a brand image that presents sensuous designs." On January 17, 2022, Mijoo was announced as the ambassador for Shinsegae's premium cosmetic brand Vidivici. On January 17, 2022, Mijoo was appointed as Nonghyup Bank's ESG model due to her "positive energy and excellent sense of entertainment". Mijoo continued her relationship with Nonghyup Bank in the promotional campaign for the newly refurbished comprehensive financial platform NH All One Bank through the release of a promotional video on June 28, 2022, under the theme "There is No Set Genre." In March 2022, Mijoo was selected as the muse for Barrel Fit, an athleisure line under the sports brand Barrel. In May 2022, Mijoo was selected as the model for lifestyle brand 95PROBLEM's compression stockings line Balance Fit. On May 30, 2022, Lotte Confectionery announced the selection of Lee Mijoo as the face of a new advertising campaign for their ice cream product Seolleim due to her "bright and cheerful image" and her "great influence on Generation Z customers". In May 2022, Lee Mijoo was chosen as one of eight models for travel brand goodchoice's summer campaign along with Yoon Jong-shin, Chang Kiha, Noh Hong-chul, Jang Yoon-ju, Meenoi, Anupam Tripathi, and Pani Bottle. In June 2022, Mijoo became the advertising model for scotch whiskey brand Label 5. 

On May 25, 2022, it was confirmed by Antenna that Mijoo would be preparing for a solo. On May 31, 2022, Antenna announced that it will be holding 'Meet & Greet with Lee Mi-joo' at 3 p.m. on June 18, 2022, at Spigen Hall in Gangnam. On October 17, 2022, Mijoo released her first solo OST "RINGING" for SBS drama Cheer Up.

On January 6, 2023, it was announced that Mijoo would host the 32nd Seoul Music Awards on January 19, 2023, taking on her first role as a host of a major award show.

Philanthropy
On August 12, 2022, Mijoo donated  to help those affected by the 2022 South Korean floods through the Hope Bridge Korea Disaster Relief Association.

In January 2023, Mijoo became the first donor in the Okcheon County Love Hometown donation project in North Chungcheong Province, donating . On January 9, 2023, it was announced that Mijoo donated around 100,000 sanitary napkins for underprivileged female teenagers.

Discography

Singles

Filmography

Television series

Web series

Television shows

Web show

Hosting

Awards and nominations

References

External links

  

1994 births
Living people
South Korean female idols
South Korean women pop singers
21st-century South Korean singers
South Korean dance musicians
21st-century South Korean women singers
K-pop singers
Lovelyz members
Woollim Entertainment artists